The GLBT History Museum of Central Florida is an organization whose mission is to collect, preserve and exhibit the histories of the gay, lesbian, bisexual, and transgender communities of Central Florida. The GLBT History Museum serves Orange, Seminole, Osceola, Lake, Brevard, Volusia, Polk, Sumter, Marion and Flagler Counties.  The Museum focuses on collecting and educating about regional history but includes items of national interest as well. It collaborates with the Regional Initiative for Collecting the History, Experiences and Stories of Central Florida (RICHES) program at the University of Central Florida.

History
The GLBT History Museum of Central Florida began in 2005 as the GLBT History Project when a small group came together to plan a history exhibit in the Orange County History Center as part of the first Come Out With Pride (COWP) celebration. Dr. Ken Kazmerski, current President of the GLBT History Museum and retired UCF Professor, and several others were approached by Metropolitan Business Association of Orlando's president, Debbie Simmons, to create a one-day GLBT exhibit at the history center. Originally the project had no money and members of the project used their own memorabilia to create displays.

Although originally Debbie Simmons chaired most of the organization's meetings, by 2006 Ken Kazmerski took over full chairmanship and began a new focus on professionalization. Over the years, the project gained a broader focus and changed the name from Project to Museum, incorporating in 2011. The GLBT History Museum of Central Florida is no longer simply an annual exhibit but now assumes the functions of a regular museum.

Mobile Displays
Along with their virtual museum, The GLBT History Museum of Central Florida maintains various mobile displays which have been exhibited in notable locations such as Universal Studios, Lake Eola Park, The GLBT Community Center of Central Florida, Darden Restaurants Corporate Headquarters, Orlando International Airport, UCF History Department, Wells Fargo, Parliament House. The organization's mobile displays include:
 Central Florida Timeline
 Wall of Remembrance
 Parliament House History
 GLBT T-shirt Display
 Historical Local GLBT Publications
 Bears of Central Florida
 GLBSU of UCF - Display and DVD
 National Coming Out Day Celebrations in Central Florida - Display and DVD
 Gay Power Unleashed: GLBT Activism in the 1960s
 GLBT Heroes and Pioneers
 Miss "P"
 The Center/GLBT Community Services
 Saviz Shafaie, Local and International Activist
 Jack Nichols, Author and National and Local Activist
 Sue Hanna, Business Woman and Owner of Faces, a woman's club

Staff
 President
Ken Kazmerski
 Vice-President
Dawn Rosendahl
 Secretary
Robert Kinney
 Treasurer
Russell Evans
 Director - Virtual Museum
David Bain
 Director - Mobile Museum
Cheryl Turner

External links
 RICHES

2005 establishments in Florida
LGBT in Florida
LGBT organizations in the United States
Organizations based in Florida
Organizations established in 2005